Mad at the World may refer to:

Mad at the World, a Christian rock band active in southern California from 1987 to 1998
Mad at the World (album), the first album by the band Mad at the World
Mad at the World (1955 film), an American film featuring David Newell as make-up artist